The Ladder Jinx is a 1922 American silent comedy film directed by Jess Robbins and starring Edward Everett Horton, Margaret Landis and Tully Marshall.

Cast
 Edward Everett Horton as 	Arthur Barnes 
 Margaret Landis as Helen Wilbur
 Wilbur Higby as 	James Wilbur
 Tully Marshall as 	Peter Stalton
 Otis Harlan as Thams Gridley
 Colin Kenny as 	Richard Twing
 Tom McGuire as 	Judge Brown
 Will Walling as 	Officer Murphy 
 Tom Murray as 	Detective Smith
 Ernest Shields as 	Cheyenne Harry
 Max Asher as 	Sam

References

Bibliography
 Connelly, Robert B. The Silents: Silent Feature Films, 1910-36, Volume 40, Issue 2. December Press, 1998.
 Munden, Kenneth White. The American Film Institute Catalog of Motion Pictures Produced in the United States, Part 1. University of California Press, 1997.

External links
 

1922 films
1922 comedy films
1920s English-language films
American silent feature films
Silent American comedy films
American black-and-white films
Films directed by Jess Robbins
Vitagraph Studios films
1920s American films